Mount Pleasant Cemetery (also known as Mount Pleasant Catholic Cemetery) is a cemetery in Bangor, Maine. Established as Bangor's Roman Catholic burial ground in 1854, it originally included 14 acres. It now includes over 69 acres.

The need for a primarily Roman Catholic burial ground arose from a rapid influx of Irish Catholic immigrants to Bangor in the 1850s and onward. Many Roman Catholic residents from nearby Buck Street Cemetery were re-interred at Mount Pleasant as well.

Notable interments
 Myrna Fahey (1933–1973), actress
 Arthur R. Gould (1857–1946), U.S. Senator from Maine

References

External links
 
 

Cemeteries in Penobscot County, Maine
Buildings and structures in Bangor, Maine
Tourist attractions in Bangor, Maine
Catholic Church in Maine